Baldor may refer to:

Baldor, a J. R. R. Tolkien character
ABB Motors & Mechanical, a manufacturer of electric motors formerly trading as Baldor Electric Company
Aurelio Baldor, a Cuban mathematician